John Morley Shrapnel (27 April 1942 – 14 February 2020) was an English actor. He is known mainly for his stage work with the Royal Shakespeare Company and the National Theatre in the United Kingdom and for his many television appearances. One of his well-known roles was Mr. Skinner in the 1996 live-action film 101 Dalmatians.

Early life
Shrapnel was born John Morley Shrapnel in Birmingham, Warwickshire (now West Midlands) on 27 April 1942, the son of journalist / author Norman Shrapnel and Mary Lillian Myfanwy (née Edwards).

Shrapnel was brought up in Stockport and London, and was educated first at Mile End School, Stockport, where he started acting as a member of the school's drama society, and then at the City of London School, an independent school for boys in the City of London, where he played Hamlet in the school play; he then attended St Catharine's College, Cambridge, from which he received an MA.

Career
As a stage actor, Shrapnel was a member of Laurence Olivier's National Theatre Company and the Royal Shakespeare Company and appeared as Sir Oliver Surface in The School for Scandal (directed by Deborah Warner) at the Barbican Centre in 2011.

Shrapnel also appeared extensively on television in roles from the 1960s onwards. He played the Earl of Sussex in Elizabeth R and Alexander Hardinge in Edward & Mrs. Simpson. He appeared in Z-Cars, Space: 1999, Inspector Morse, GBH, Coogan's Run, Foyle's War, and many other dramas. He presented an episode of the 1983 BBC television travel series Great Little Railways. He performed in three of the BBC Television Shakespeare plays and as Creon in the BBC's productions of the Three Theban plays (1986) of Sophocles. He also played Pompey in the second episode of Ancient Rome: The Rise and Fall of an Empire and the Jail Warden in The 10th Kingdom.

His film career included roles in Nicholas and Alexandra (1971), Pope Joan (1972), Hennessy (1975), Personal Services (1987), Testimony (1988), How to Get Ahead in Advertising (1989), England, My England (1995), 101 Dalmatians (1996) as Mr. Skinner, Notting Hill (1999), The Body (2001), K-19: The Widowmaker (2002), and Alien Autopsy (2006). He has also appeared in historical films such as Gladiator (2000) as Senator Gaius, and in Troy (2004) as Nestor. In Elizabeth: The Golden Age (2007), he played Lord Howard and The Duchess (2008) as General Grey.

Shrapnel had the rare distinction of appearing in two episodes of Midsomer Murders as two characters in "Death in Chorus" and "Written in Blood." He appeared in Jonathan Creek episode "The Omega Man" as Professor Lance Graumann. He appears in Chemical Wedding alongside Simon Callow, telling the tale of the resurrection of occultist Aleister Crowley. He played John Christie (from a 1980s case) in "Solidarity" of Waking the Dead.

He also had experience in the field of BBC radio drama: He played Colin Dexter's Inspector Morse (opposite Robert Glenister as Sgt. Lewis) and starred in William Gibson's Neuromancer. Shrapnel played the character Deputy Assistant Commissioner John Felsham in the New Tricks episode The Fourth Man (2010). He also narrated episodes of Wild Discovery.

Shrapnel was the son-in-law of Deborah Kerr and Tony Bartley through his 1975 marriage to their younger daughter Francesca Ann Bartley. He and Francesca had three sons, the writer Joe Shrapnel (b. 1976) and the actors Lex Shrapnel (b. 1979) and Tom Shrapnel (b. 1981). Shrapnel lived the last years of his life with his family in Highbury, north London. His ancestor Henry Shrapnel gave the name shrapnel to the English language.

Death
Shrapnel died at his home in Suffolk on St Valentine's Day, 14 February 2020. He was 77 years old.

Filmography

Television

References

External links
 

1942 births
2020 deaths
Alumni of St Catharine's College, Cambridge
English male film actors
English male Shakespearean actors
English male stage actors
English male television actors
Male actors from Birmingham, West Midlands
People educated at the City of London School
Royal Shakespeare Company members